World War III is the third studio album by the American rapper Mac, released on September 28, 1999,  on No Limit Records. It was produced by a wide range of producers, including Mac himself, Donald XL Robertson and Carlos Stephens.

Commercial Performance
World War III did significantly less well on the Billboard charts compared with his previous album, Shell Shocked. It peaked at #44 on the US  Billboard 200 and #6 on the US Top R&B/Hip-Hop Albums. This was his last album of original material and his last for No Limit as, shortly after its release, Mac was convicted of manslaughter.

Music video
Along with singles, a music video was released for "War Party" featuring Magic and D.I.G.. It was premiered  on Rap City.

Track listing
 "Intro"
 "War Party" (featuring Magic & D.I.G.)
 "Best Friends"
 "Like Before"(featuring Storm) 
 "We Deadly" (featuring Master P, Skull Duggery & Silkk the Shocker)
 "Bloody" (featuring Magic)
 "You Never Know" (featuring Mia X)
 "Just Another Thug" (featuring C-Murder)
 "Battle Cry (Tomorrow)" 
 "If It's Cool" (featuring Ms Peaches)
 "Cops and Robbers" 
 "Lock Down (Remix)" 
 "Paradise" (featuring Popeye & Samm)
 "That's Hip Hop" 
 "Can U Love Me? (Eyes of a Killer)" 
 "Genocide (Skit)"
 "Genocide" (featuring Master P & Ms Peaches)
 "Father's Day"
 "Still Callin' Me" (featuring Sons of Funk & Ms Peaches)
 "Assassin Nation" (featuring Storm)
 "Outro"

Samples
"If it's Cool" samples "How Do U Want It" by 2Pac.

Personnel
Credits from World War III
Beats by the Pound - producer  
Bigg Cheez - associate producer  
Lupe Ceballos - project co-ordinator  
Gabe Chiesa - mixing  
C-Murder - composer, featured artist, guest artist, primary artist  
Jodi Cohen - design, layout design  
D.I.G. - composer, featured artist  
DJ Wop - producer  
Fiend - guest artist  
Leslie Henderson - photography  
Ke'Noe - producer  
Kine - vocals  
M.A.C. - primary artist  
Mac - performer, producer  
Larry Mac - composer  
Magic - featured artist  
Master P - executive producer, featured artist, guest artist, primary artist  
Mia X - guest artist  
Ms Peaches - featured artist  
Michael Pandos - assistant engineer  
Popeye - featured artist, guest artist   
Rajsmoove - producer  
Renior - featured artist, primary artist, producer  
Donald "XL" Robertson - associate producer, drum programming, producer, vocals  
Sam - featured artist  
Silkk the Shocker - guest artist  
Alex Sok - mixing  
Sons of Funk - featured artist, primary artist, vocals  
Carlos Stephens - producer  
Eugene "Big Gene" Stephens - associate producer, guitar, producer  
The Storm - featured artist, guest artist, primary artist  
Sugar - producer, featured artist   
Sugar Bear - producer  
Rod "Bass Heavy" Tillman - associate producer, bass guitar, piano, producer  
Rob Worthington - assistant engineer  
XL - featured artist, primary artist

Charts

Album

References

1999 albums
Mac (rapper) albums
No Limit Records albums
Priority Records albums